Port Quebec or Port Québec may refer to:

 Port of Quebec, the port of Quebec City
 HMS Port Quebec